These lists of tallest structures in Serbia rank structures in Serbia by absolute height and buildings by official height (excluding Kosovo). The tallest structure in Serbia is currently the chimney of Thermal power plant Kostolac B which rises .

These lists rank Serbia's tallest completed structures (buildings and towers) by official height, which means spires are included but not antennas.

Chimneys

Towers

Buildings

Skyscrapers

Highrises

Religious Buildings

List of tallest structures under construction, on-hold, proposed or approved.

Notes

See also
 List of tallest buildings in Kosovo
 List of tallest structures in Kosovo
 List of tallest buildings in Balkans
 List of tallest buildings in Bosnia and Herzegovina
 List of tallest structures in Republika Srpska
 List of tallest buildings in Croatia
 List of tallest buildings in North Macedonia
 List of tallest buildings in Slovenia

References

External links
 Diagram of Serbia Buildings on Skyscraperpage
 Serbia Page on Emporis.com

Serbia
Tallest
Serbia